Janice H. Hammond is an American economist currently the Jesse Philips Professor of Manufacturing at Harvard Business School. She teaches the Business Analytics course at Harvard Business School online.

References

Year of birth missing (living people)
Living people
Harvard Business School faculty
American women economists
21st-century American women